The Pais Movement is a global non-denominational, non-profit organization that creates partnerships between schools, communities, businesses, and churches.

Paul Clayton Gibbs founded the organization in Manchester, Great Britain. Gibbs initiated partnerships that lead to the beginning of the Pais Project in 1992. Pais Project evolved into what is currently known as the Pais Movement.

The organization provides three distinct programs aimed to “mobilize the many.” 

 Apprenticeships: Pais Movement mobilizes young adults by offering free mission-year apprenticeships. Apprentices serve in communities, building partnerships between schools, businesses, and churches. 
 Pais Youth Academy: Pais Movement mobilizes teenagers through mentorship, adventure, and faith-based training. 
 Affiliates: Pais Movement mobilizes adults by offering faith-based training in evangelism, discipleship, study, and other content.

Pais Movement is headquartered in Arlington, Texas, U.S.A.

History

Pais GB

Established 1992. In 1992, as a result of connections that were made with various local schools and Sharon Church, Moston, Manchester where Gibbs was based, the first Pais team was initiated. The team consisted of four apprentices who taught lessons and led assemblies, primarily to students from 11–16 years old.

As the Pais Project grew, it offered a professional training program and as more applications were received from prospective apprentices, the Pais Project extended across England until in 2000 it pioneered its first team in Northern Ireland. In 2009 it moved its headquarters from Manchester to Burnley where Pais GB is currently based at Life Church, Burnley. In 2018, Pais Great Britain was renamed as Pais United Kingdom.

Pais Ireland

Established 2000. In 2000 Pais started its first team based in Belfast. Due to being well received and its non-denominational stance, it enabled the teams to establish a rapport with both Protestant and Roman Catholic schools and youth groups. Their aim was to bring unity within the communities employing a relational approach. In 2010 Pais teams started to work in Cork.
Pais Ireland currently has its headquarters in Portrush.

Pais USA

Established 2002. In 2002 the first Pais nation outside of Europe was established. Pais USA received a special endorsement from Max Lucado, an American best-selling author, writer, and preacher. Pais USA is based in Arlington, Texas with various teams working in schools and youth groups throughout the country.

Pais Germany

Established 2003. A wide range of opportunities arose for Pais Germany following the “PISA shock” when German schools were criticized for their comparatively poor performance in relation to their global counterparts. Pais Germany has a unique relationship with the German government. The government fully supports the organization and a year spent as a Pais apprentice is considered as a Voluntary social year. Pais Germany headquarters are in Neumünster.

Pais Global
Established 2005. In October 2005, following Gibbs's relocation to the US, the organization had grown to such an extent that a specialist team was launched as a resource center for the worldwide Pais Teams. The headquarters are in Arlington, Texas.

Pais Ghana

Established 2008. In 2008 the Pais Project extended into Africa. Apprentices mainly work in schools in the capital city of Ghana although teams have also partnered with local churches, hospitals, and orphanages in the neighboring rural areas. Pais Ghana headquarters are in Accra.

Pais Brazil

Established 2012. In 2012 Pais began in South America, working alongside the local church in the schools and heavily populated urban slums known as 'favelas’. Pais Brazil has its headquarters in Natal, Rio Grande do Norte.

Pais India

Established 2013. Pais India was established in 2013 by an Indian Pais apprentice who had trained for two years with Pais GB. He returned to India in July 2013 and started Pais India with various colleagues, reaching schools and campuses surrounding Chennai.

Pais Pakistan

Established 2013.  The organization has released little information about its work in Pakistan for the security of its staff and apprentices.

Pais Kenya

Established 2014.  Pais Kenya was launched in 2014. It was initially established in Nairobi and grew to other cities, such as Zimmerman, where it extended its work in local schools and youth groups.

Pais Australia

Established 2015.  The extension of Pais into Australia takes the Movement into its sixth continent. Pais Australia is currently based in Brisbane.

Rest of the World

Pais also works in other nations primarily through specialist trainers and teachers: Canada, Denmark, Faroe Islands, Nigeria, South Africa, Uganda, Tanzania, and the Philippines.

Future Nations

The vision of the Pais Movement is to further extend its work globally with plans of launching teams in Nepal, and Italy.

Founder

Paul Clayton Gibbs is the founder and global director of the Pais Movement. Born in Manchester, Great Britain, he is married to Lynn and has two boys, Joel and Levi.

Gibb's early career was in retail management but he later decided to commit himself to working full-time at his local church.

He established contacts with local schools which eventually led to the concept of the Pais Project being launched in 1992. The Pais Project was established as an inter-denominational youth and schools ministry. Gibbs worked as a youth leader within his local church and directed Pais teams in the area.

In the mid-1990s, Gibbs became a Director with Youth Alive. During this time, he pioneered Youthlink, a national training curriculum, and assisted with other local projects.

In 2000, Gibbs became the Senior Minister at the faith works in Failsworth, Oldham, a church that partnered with The Message Trust and planted the Eden Project, an award-winning community endeavor.

In 2004, Gibbs launched his own Mentoring Academy and in October 2005 moved to the US, where he served on the Senior Leadership Team of a Texan megachurch.

In 2009, Gibbs committed himself full-time to the development of Pais, launching various initiatives and resources such as mypais.com and Livewire, a weekly training video.

Gibbs teaches throughout the world on topics which include pioneering, leadership development and the Kingdom of God. His books are published by Harris House Publishing.

Gibbs is best known for his ability to combine ancient methods of discipleship with a communication style that is particularly suited to a post-modern society. He has gained national recognition in the UK and has written courses for, and spoken at various Bible colleges and seminaries in the UK and the States, such as Mattersey Hall, Nazarene Theological College (England) and Southwestern Baptist Theological Seminary.

Pais Programs

Apprenticeships

The Pais Movement offers "free" apprenticeships. The apprenticeship includes training, accommodation & meals. The training consists of 200 lecture hours, 1,800 experiential training and is valued at a total of 10,400 American dollars. Upon successful completion apprentices receive a recognized certificate. Apprentices may serve as a part of the following team types: Pais Project, Pais Venture, Pais Collective, Pais Infrastructure.
	

Youth Academy

Pais Movement offers free faith-based training and mentorship to teenagers. Teenagers are discipled in Pais’ three distinctives: mission, discipleship, and study. Pais apprentices lead youth academy members on experiences that lead to the education of biblical principles.

Affiliate Program

Pais Movement provides extensive ministry training and resources through an online platform called MyPais. Affiliates may register for course material and select online or in-person training.

Training and Resources

MYPAIS

MYPAIS is a website that provides a free extensive resource of online training videos, brochures & catalytic programs.

SWAP
SWAP is an international three-day conference held on various continents that promotes discussion of the three Pais distinctives. The objective is to bring communities together to collaborate on new, fresh and insightful ideas.

Films

Released by Windward Productions, The Spirit of a Pioneer is a documentary based on the book ‘The Line and the Dot’ by Paul Clayton Gibbs. It tells the story of young adventurers who give their lives to touch the hearts of young people. The film was produced to inspire and inform those with a dream to make a difference in the world.

Apprenticeship Programs

Pais has worked with schools, universities, churches, and businesses for thirty years. In that time it has grown from a local schools project to an internationally based organization of autonomous and independently run national organizations on six continents. 

Pais Project

A Pais Project team bridges the gap between churches and its surrounding schools and community.

Pais Collective
 

A Pais Collective team works with adults, and acts as a catalyst for evangelism, church planting, and college outreach.

Pais Venture

A Pais Venture team works with businesses and helps them build a kingdom-minded culture within an office environment.

Pais Infrastructure

Apprentices serve in an office environment and provide logistical and resource support to Pais teams globally. Apprentices may serve in 5 areas of support: Finance, Training, Personnel, Communications, and Media.

References

External links
 Pais Movement website
 MYPAIS website

Arlington, Texas
Non-profit organizations based in Texas
Christian missionary societies
Christian youth organizations
Evangelical parachurch organizations
Nondenominational Christian societies and communities
International non-profit organizations
Youth organizations based in the United States